Roderick Charles Carey (born July 24, 1971) is an American football coach and former player. He served as the head football coach at Northern Illinois University from 2012 to 2018 and Temple University from 2019 to 2021.

Early years
Carey was born in Madison, Wisconsin and played college football as a center at Indiana University Bloomington from 1990 to 1993.

Coaching career

Early coaching career
Following his playing career, Carey began his coaching career as an assistant at his alma mater, Wayzata High School in Plymouth, Minnesota, before moving to the college ranks and making stop at the University  of Minnesota, the University of Wisconsin–Stout, Illinois State University, and the University of North Dakota.

Northern Illinois
Arriving at Northern Illinois University in 2008, Carey coached the offensive line for the Huskies until 2012, when he became the offensive coordinator of the team for the 2012 season. After orchestrating an offense that was No. 13 in the nation at 38.6 points per game, Carey replaced Dave Doeren after Doeren left to take the head coaching job at North Carolina State prior to the 2013 Orange Bowl.

Over the next six seasons, Carey would go 52–30 at the helm of the Huskies and won two Mid-American Conference championships and four MAC West Division titles. Carey also defeated four Big Ten Conference opponents during his tenure. He left the program in 2018 to become the new head coach for Temple Owls.

Temple
On January 10, 2019, it was announced that Carey would replace Manny Diaz as the head coach at Temple. 

Carey won eight games in his first season at Temple, which was enough for the team to receive an invite to the 2019 Military Bowl, but the Owls were blown out by North Carolina losing by a score of 55–13. The Owls struggled in the 2020 season, which was cut short by the COVID-19 pandemic, winning just one game.

The 2021 season was Carey's first with a Temple roster that was recruited almost entirely by him. However, after starting the season 3–2, Temple ended the season on a seven game losing streak and finished with a record of 3–9. Temple lost every one of their final seven games by at least 20 points. Carey also faced accusations of losing support in the Temple locker room after multiple players including the team's starting quarterback and number one wide receiver entered the transfer portal. On November 29, 2021, Temple fired Carey becoming the first Temple coach to be fired since Jerry Berndt in 1992. Prior to Carey, Temple's previous four head coaches all left the school to become Power Five coaches.

Indiana
After joining the staff as a quality control coach before the 2022 season, Carey was appointed as Indiana's offensive line coach on October 9, 2022.

Head coaching record

Notes

References

External links
 Temple profile
 Northern Illinois profile

1971 births
Living people
American football centers
Illinois State Redbirds football coaches
Indiana Hoosiers football players
Minnesota Golden Gophers football coaches
North Dakota Fighting Hawks football coaches
Northern Illinois Huskies football coaches
Temple Owls football coaches
Wisconsin–Stout Blue Devils football coaches
Sportspeople from Madison, Wisconsin
High school football coaches in Minnesota
People from Wayzata, Minnesota
Coaches of American football from Minnesota
Players of American football from Minnesota